The 2011–12 Bucknell Bison men's basketball team represented Bucknell University during the 2011–12 NCAA Division I men's basketball season. The Bison, led by fourth year head coach Dave Paulsen, played their home games at Sojka Pavilion and are members of the Patriot League. They finished the season 25–10, 12–2 in Patriot League play to be crowned regular season champions. They lost in the championship game of the Patriot League Basketball tournament to Lehigh. As regular season champions, they received an automatic bid into the 2012 National Invitation Tournament where they defeated Arizona in the first round before falling in the second round to Nevada.

Roster

Schedule

|-
!colspan=9| Regular season

|-
!colspan=9| 2012 Patriot League men's basketball tournament

|-
!colspan=9| 2012 NIT

References

Bucknell Bison men's basketball seasons
Bucknell
Bucknell
Bucknell Bison
Bucknell Bison